Otto Steinböck (April 10, 1893 – October 6, 1969) was an Austrian zoologist.

Life
Otto Steinböck was born in 1893 in Graz, as the ninth of 11 children. In 1911, after finishing the basic school with distinction, he started to study Law at his father's request, although his passion was zoology.

After passing the first state exam, he moved on October 1, 1913 to Nevesinje, Herzegovina, in order to serve as a one-year volunteer in the Austria-Hungary's mountain artillery. When the war broke out, he came to the Serbian front. He was wounded in 1914 and in 1918 was decorated first lieutenant and battery commander while in captivity in Trento, Italy, returning home in October 1919.

After finishing his law studies, he began to study natural history in 1920, especially the biological subjects, and earned his doctorate on February 10, 1923 with the thesis "Monographie der Prorhynchidae (Turbellaria Alloeocoela)". The turbellarians remained his subject of interest throughout his life.

From 1923 to 1927, Steinböck was unemployed, but kept himself occupied with his scientific works at the Zoological Institute in Graz. In 1925 he married Gisela von Chiapo, a great-niece of botanist Friedrich Welwitsch. She was then responsible for the couple's economic brunt with her job as a language teacher.

Finally, in July 1927, he was qualified for zoology because of his scientific works published until that time. On October 1, 1927 he became an associate assistant of Prof. Dr. A. Steuer at the Zoological Institute of the University of Innsbruck. After two years as an assistant, he was appointed as associate professor on January 1, 1930.  In 1931 he became professor of zoology and director of the Zoological Institute after Steuer left in order to become director of the German-Italian Institute of Marine Biology in Rovinj.

At the beginning of World War II, Steinböck had to join again. He became the head of a mountain artillery battery on the western front and was promoted to captain of the reserve and won two awards. He was dismissed on August 31, 1940 and returned to the Institute.

From 1941 until the ward ended, Steinböck was under the rectorate of Raimund von Klebelsberg of the Faculty of Natural Sciences. He knew that it was considered a very sensitive office always committed to help colleagues who had been politically exposed. However, after the war, he ended up dismissed for political reasons. In 1947 his dismissal was converted into a retirement, so that the circumstances made it hard to consider a return to scientific work. Nevertheless, the ethical attitude of the faculty insisted on his reinstatement and he was eventually rehabilitated in November 1950 and reappointed as a professor on February 6, 1951. He retired in 1963, becoming an emeritus professor, and died on October 6, 1969 in Innsbruck.

Work
Most Steinböck's works were focused on the anatomy of turbellarians. He also published several limnobiological studies conducted in lakes and streams in the Alps.

Selected works

References

20th-century Austrian zoologists
1893 births
1969 deaths